Jonathan Caren is an American playwright and TV writer. His plays have been seen or developed at The Manhattan Theatre Club, Roundabout Theatre Company, Primary Stages, Ensemble Studio Theatre, The Rattlestick, The New Group, Williamstown Theater Festival, Ars Nova, Keen Company, The IAMA Theatre Company, Woodshed, The Berkshire Playwrights Lab, The Lark, New York Stage and Film, The Jewish Plays Project, Partial Comfort, The Samuel French OOB Festival, and The Old Vic in London through the T.S. Eliot UK/US exchange.

The plays include Need to Know (Colt Coeur, Rogue Machine), The Recommendation (The Windy City Playhouse, IAMA, The Flea, The Old Globe, Craig Noel Award for Best New Play, Ovation Award for Best New Play, NAACP nomination), Catch The Fish (Most Outstanding Play, NY Fringe), Canyon directed by Whitney White in a collaboration between IAMA and The Latino Theater Company, and Four Woke Baes directed by Teddy Bergman (workshop at Primary Stages).

He is a member of the Primary Stages Dorothy Strelsin New American Writers Group, a MacDowell Colony Fellow, a Dramatist Guild Fellow, a winner of New York Stage and Film Founder's Award, a fellowship recipient of SPACE at Ryder Farm, a two-time Lecomte du Nouy award winner, and a recipient of the Theater Publicus Prize for Dramatic Fiction. Additionally, he was a finalist for the Laurents/Hatcher Award and a nominee for the Otis Guerney New American Playwright's Award.

He has written for season three of USA's  The Sinner , ABC's a million little things, NBC's Rise, executive produced by Jason Katims, Netflix’s Gypsy, starring Naomi Watts. He has written pilots for FOX and CBS. His first credit was writing for the CW’s Melrose Place reboot.

His play The Morning The Sun Fell Down was adapted into a feature  by Choice Films, starring Danny Pudi.

He is a graduate of Juilliard’s Lila Acheson Wallace American Playwrights Program and Vassar College, where he studied mythology and religion.

Plays 

Four Woke Baes 
Canyon
The Recommendation
 Catch The Fish
 Need to Know

References 

Living people
American dramatists and playwrights
American television writers
American male screenwriters
American male dramatists and playwrights
American male television writers
Year of birth missing (living people)
Place of birth missing (living people)